Vimto is a soft drink first sold in Lancashire in the United Kingdom. It was first manufactured as a health tonic in cordial form, then decades later as a carbonated drink. It contains the juice of grapes, raspberries and blackcurrants (at a 3% concentration), flavoured with herbs and spices. The original recipe was invented in 1908 by John Noel Nichols. Nichols was born in Blackburn, England and educated at the then Blackburn Grammar School. 

Vimto has also been made into a sweet (made under license by McCowan's) and an ice lolly. It is available in cans and bottles and as a draught soft drink in pubs.

History
Vimto was created in 1908 in Manchester by John Noel Nichols (1883–1966), a wholesaler of herbs, spices and medicines. He saw the market opening for soft drinks due to the temperance movement and the passage of the 1908 Licensing Act. It was originally sold under the name Vim Tonic, which Nichols shortened to 'Vimto' in 1912. Vimto was originally registered as a health tonic or medicine, which was then re-registered in 1913 as a cordial. 

In 1910, production moved to a warehouse at Chapel Street, Salford, then to Old Trafford in 1927, and in 1971, to a state-of-the-art plant in Wythenshawe, Manchester. In 1999, the company's head office moved to Newton-le-Willows in St Helens, Merseyside.

From the 1990s to 2003, Vimto print advertisements used the cartoon character Purple Ronnie, along with slightly rude poems by Giles Andreae, the creator of Purple Ronnie. In 2003, Purple Ronnie was dropped, and a new creative direction was adopted, revolving around the benefits of 'Shlurpling the Purple'. This, in turn, led to the launch in 2006 of Billy and his Dad's Pants–a modern-day morality story in which, despite turning up at the swimming pool with his Dad's pants in the middle of his rolled-up towel, Billy wins out with ingenuity and humour. The theme tune 'Dad's Pants' become something of a cult classic, and was based on the Loudon Wainwright III song "Dead Skunk". 

An oak sculpture entitled "A Monument to Vimto" was created by Kerry Morrison and installed on Granby Row–the location of the original Vimto premises–in central Manchester in 1992. The statue was restored and repainted in 2011.

Manufacture
Vimto is currently produced by Refresco (formerly Cott Corporation) in both Leicestershire and Yorkshire on behalf of Vimto Soft Drinks, a division of Nichols plc. Nichols moved out of manufacturing in 2003 when it closed its final production site in Golborne. 

Vimto is also manufactured under licence in Saudi Arabia, in Dammam city, Yemen, The Gambia, and Ghana. A Sunday Times article in 2007 claimed it to be the most popular drink during the holy month of Ramadan in some Arab countries.

The drink was also made under licence in the United Kingdom by A.G. Barr in 1996.

In 2014, the recipe for Fizzy Vimto was changed to include artificial sweeteners, Acesulfame potassium and sucralose.

Ellis Wilkinson Mineral Water facilitated the production of drinks for Vimto in their early days of trading.

Company
A subsidiary of Nichols plc, Cabana is the distribution arm of the company, and operates via a UK-wide network of distributors that are, in the main, independent. In Scotland and Sussex, the distributor is a wholly owned subsidiary of Cabana (Scotland–Cariel, and Sussex–Beacon Drinks now closed). 

Vimto is currently available in 65 countries and the number of countries in which it is on sale is growing.

Variations

Both a still, dilutable version ("Vimto Cordial") and a carbonated premixed version ("Fizzy Vimto") are available in the UK. While Vimto has its origins in Northern England, it can now be found both nationally and internationally. The cordial version is more widely sold and is available in concentrate and ready-to-drink varieties. The cordial version was widely known for being suitable for vegans until Vimto decided to add vitamin D derived from sheep's wool in April 2021.

Vimto is also available in a slush variety alongside many other different Vimto confectionery products, such as Vimto bars, lollipops, Rip Rolls, candy sprays, and Jelly Babies.

Vimto is also available in a summer flavour, containing ingredients such as orange and apple, both of which are cordial products. Vimto was the UK's fastest-growing soft drinks brand by value in 2006 (as measured by Nielsen Corporation).

An alcoholic cocktail known as the Cheeky Vimto or "Crazy Vimto" is also drunk in the UK. However, Vimto is not an ingredient of this beverage, and the name comes from its resemblance to the original product; instead, it contains port and Blue WKD. There is also a variant of this cocktail called "Dirty Vimto" that replaces the port with Buckfast Tonic Wine.

Vimto is also often made as a hot beverage by simply adding boiling water to the concentrate, and is popular in this form throughout the north of England. Vimto is often made with hot water, especially during the winter months. It is also taken to sporting events in vacuum flasks by spectators as a warming drink to fend off the winter chill.

Various alternate-flavoured variants of Vimto were introduced over the years; cherry- and strawberry-flavoured variants, known as "Cherry Vimto" and "Strawberry Vimto", have become part of the range. In 2016, a new variant, "Vimto Remix", was introduced. This range consists of various alternate flavour mixes that were introduced each year – mango, strawberry and pineapple in 2016, raspberry, orange, and passionfruit in 2017, watermelon, strawberry, and peach in 2018 and strawberry, orange and lime in 2019. The "Remix" name was eventually dropped after the drink was rebranded in 2021, while new flavour mixes continue to be introduced.

Homemade variations include a Vimto Milkshake made by adding milk instead of water to the cordial, and a Vimto Milkshake Special involving the same with vanilla ice-cream added.

Foreign markets
In the Arabian Peninsula, Vimto has had over 80 years of dominance as the beverage of choice for the iftar or sunset feast during the Islamic holy fasting month of Ramadan. As of 2013, Aujan, the local bottler in Saudi Arabia, has been producing over 20 million bottles per year for the GCC market.
An article in The Sunday Times mentioned some 15 million bottles were sold during the one-month season in 2007.

In Saudi Arabia, Vimto is manufactured under licence by the Aujan Industrial Company and has a 90% market share in the cordial concentrated drinks market. Every year, the company launches aggressive marketing campaigns on Arab satellite TV channels that in recent years have become very popular, and achieved cult status with viral marketing videos exchanged on the Internet.

Vimto was introduced to The Gambia and Senegal in the 1980s, where it remains popular.

In 2011, Vimto once again became widely available throughout the Republic of Ireland, through Tesco and the local version of Iceland shops.

In Pakistan, Vimto is produced under licence by Mehran Bottlers.

In Nepal, Vimto is manufactured under licence by Himganga Beverage Pvt Ltd.

In Ghana, Vimto is manufactured under licence by Coca-Cola Bottling Company of Ghana Ltd.

See also

 Ribena
 Sosyo

References

External links
 Vimto UK web site
 Vimto international web site
 British Society of Flavourists lecture about Vimto

1908 establishments in England
British soft drink brands
Products introduced in 1908